The Roads and Transport Policing Command, formerly the Safer Transport Command and Transport Operational Command Unit, is a unit of the London Metropolitan Police Service that polices roads, buses, bus routes, taxis and minicabs. It does not police national railways in London, London Underground, Docklands Light Railway or Tramlink, which fall under the remit of the British Transport Police (BTP). 

Formed in 2002 as a joint venture with Transport for London (TfL), it consolidated several existing policing operations.  The OCU also has Special Constables working alongside regular officers in all areas of the command.

The Unit maintains a joint command and control centre with London Buses called MetroComm, which is also the command and control centre of the Traffic Operational Command Unit.

In response to a survey conducted by TfL, which showed that 15% of women using public transport in London had been the subject of some form of unwanted sexual behaviour but that 90% of incidents went unreported, the Safer Transport Command—in conjunction with the BTP, City of London Police, and TfL—launched Project Guardian, which aimed to reduce sexual offences and increase reporting.

Operational history 
On 1 April 2009, Transport OCU became part of Territorial Policing. On 29 September 2009, Transport OCU became known as the Safer Transport Command.

On 1 December 2014, the Safer Transport Command and the Traffic Operational Command Unit were merged to create the Roads & Transport Policing Command (RTPC). RTPC provides the MPS with a single, combined command unit responsible for policing the capital's roads and transport network.

References

External links
Safer Transport Command official website
Roads & Transport Policing Command official website

Metropolitan Police units
Transport authorities in London